Zebra Fish is an outdoor 1989 sculpture by Wayne Chabre, installed at the University of Oregon campus in Eugene, Oregon, in the United States. The hammered copper sheet high-relief measures approximately  x  x . It was surveyed and deemed "treatment needed" by the Smithsonian Institution's "Save Outdoor Sculpture!" in March 1993. It is administered by the University of Oregon.

See also
 1989 in art

References

1989 establishments in Oregon
1989 sculptures
Animal sculptures in Oregon
Copper sculptures in Oregon
Fish in art
Outdoor sculptures in Eugene, Oregon
Sculptures by Wayne Chabre
University of Oregon campus